Cacostola ornata is a species of beetle in the family Cerambycidae. It was described by Fleutiaux and Sallé in 1899. It is known from Grenada, Barbados, Martinique, and Guadeloupe.

References

Cacostola
Beetles described in 1899